StartingBloc is a social innovation Fellowship that educates, inspires and connects emerging leaders to drive social innovation across sectors,
with a community of over 2,500 international Fellows. The Fellowship's mission is to support "leaders crafting a future that works for all beings." StartingBloc has fifteen local chapters. It has been named as one of the "5 Fellowships to Jumpstart your Changemaking Journey".

StartingBloc Community 

StartingBloc brings together change leaders and social innovators from different sectors, including: entrepreneurs, intrapreneurs, social activists, artists, government workers, educators, students and many others. 2500 Fellows represent 56 countries and work in organizations, such as: IDEO, ReWork, BBC, Nike, Google, Acumen, the World Bank Group.

StartingBloc Institutes 

StartingBloc Fellowship starts with a 5-day intensive Institute, where Fellows develop key leadership skills, join a community of over 2,500 professionals across the globe and cultivate social impact ideas. Institutes have taken place in LA, Boston, DC, New Orleans, among others. Participation in the Institute requires a tuition payment of $1,500 to cover programming costs and most meals; participants must provide for their own travel and accommodations.  A limited number of partial and full scholarships is available for accepted candidates on the basis of merit and financial need. In return, fellows receive access to a global network of social innovators, as well as certain benefits arranged specifically for fellows.
The Programming includes:

 Transformative Action: Fellows learn about the most effective ways that citizens create social progress. 
 Polarity Mapping: Many of the issues that leaders face are not problems to be solved but polarities to be balanced.
 Rapid Prototyping: Fellows learn about design thinking and put it into action to tackle the challenges of select local impact organizations.

Institutes bring together speakers from a range of industries, such as Scott Sherman, Executive Director of Transformative Action Institute, Robert Egger, the founder of the DC Central Kitchen & LA Kitchen, and Majora Carter, the CEO of Startup Box.

References

Non-profit organizations based in the United States